Take Me to the Edge is a British reality series investigating global rites of passage. Host Leo Houlding brings five adults to different parts of the world, where they experience local rites of passage such as rock climbs, running through fire, drinking blood straight from a cow's neck and climbing into a swarm of bees.

The six-part series was commissioned by and first shown on Virgin1 (now known as "Channel One"), and has been re-aired in 2009 on Scottish television station, STV.

Episodes
 Vanuatu
 New Zealand
 Bhutan
 Kenya
 India
 Oman

External links

2000s British reality television series
2008 British television series debuts
2008 British television series endings
Channel One (British and Irish TV channel) original programming
Ginger Productions
English-language television shows